Oleh Olehovych Blokhin (born 20 October 1980) is a Ukrainian professional football player. He last played in the Russian Second Division for FC Syzran-2003 Syzran. He also holds Ukrainian citizenship.

External links
 Career summary by KLISF

1980 births
Living people
Ukrainian footballers
Ukrainian expatriate footballers
Expatriate footballers in Russia
Expatriate footballers in Kazakhstan
Expatriate footballers in Moldova
FC Kremin Kremenchuk players
FC Lada-Tolyatti players
FC Sokol Saratov players
FC Dynamo Stavropol players
FC Sodovik Sterlitamak players
FC Bashinformsvyaz-Dynamo Ufa players
Association football defenders